The Warsaw Jewish Cemetery is one of the largest Jewish cemeteries in Europe and in the world. Located on Warsaw's Okopowa Street and abutting the Christian Powązki Cemetery, the Jewish necropolis was established in 1806 and occupies 33 hectares (83 acres) of land. The cemetery contains over 250,000 marked graves, as well as mass graves of victims of the Warsaw Ghetto. Although the cemetery was closed down during World War II, after the war it was reopened and a small portion of it remains active, serving Warsaw's existing Jewish population.

As the necropolis was established to replace many smaller cemeteries closer to the city centre, it was designed to serve all Jewish communities of Warsaw, regardless of their affiliation. Hence, it is subdivided into several districts dubbed quarters (kwatery), historically reserved for various groups. Among them are three Orthodox (for men, women and one for holy scriptures), Reform Judaism, children, military and Warsaw Ghetto Uprising victims.

The cemetery, which has become a dense forest in the post-war period, is filled with monuments dedicated to notable personas such as politicians, spiritual leaders, inventors, economists and others. Many of the markers are simple, others are elaborately carved and richly decorated. Large mausoleums appear in styles ranging from Egyptian revival to Art Deco.

History 

In 1806 Warsaw's Jewish Commune petitioned the government to establish a new cemetery for Jewish inhabitants of Warsaw. The Bródno Jewish Cemetery, in existence since 1769, was nearly at capacity and the chevra kadisha sought a new burial ground. The lot chosen was located right outside of the city limits in the borough of Wola, next to a new Catholic Powązki Cemetery established in 1790. The petition was accepted and in the following year the cemetery was established. The earliest headstone was dated December 6, 1806 and belonged to certain Nachum son of Nachum of Siemiatycze, but it did not survive to our times. The first woman interred there was certain Elka Junghoff, daughter of Jehuda Leib Mulrat of Kalisz. Her tombstone is dated November 26, 1804, but the date is most likely wrong. Hence the oldest surviving headstone belongs to Sara, daughter of Eliezer (died September 8, 1807).

Unlike other cemeteries in Europe, all the graves in the Okopowa Street cemetery have their backs to the cemetery gate. The tradition of placing graves facing the cemetery gate stems from the belief that at the future resurrection of the dead, the dead will rise up and be able to leave the cemetery without having to turn around. However, in 1819, when one community member was accidentally buried with his head, rather than his feet, facing the cemetery gate, Rabbi Szlomo Zalman Lipszyc, the first Chief Rabbi of Warsaw, ruled that all future burials should be done the same way, to avoid causing embarrassment to the first one buried in this manner.

During the first decades of its existence the new Okopowa Street cemetery was used mostly by the higher strata of Jewish society, with poorer Jews interred in the Bródno Jewish Cemetery in the easternmost borough of Bródno, on the right bank of the Vistula. Despite that the cemetery quickly became overcrowded and already in 1824 it had to be expanded. Around that time the Tsarist authorities took over the administration of the cemetery from the chevra kadisha and by 1850 established a separate funeral administration. The first on-site funeral home was established in 1828, but already in 1831 it was destroyed by Russian Army in the course of the November Uprising. A new building was erected the following year and further expanded in 1854. In the meantime the necropolis was extended twice: in 1840 and 1848. Around that time it became the main Jewish cemetery of Warsaw, for rich and poor alike.

Historically the cemetery was separated from the city centre and the quarter inhabited by Jews by a deep ditch, the so-called Lubomirski Ramparts, created in 1777 to stop the spread of plague and as a tax measure. It was not until 1873 that both Jewish and Catholic communities were allowed to build a bridge across the ditch to facilitate access to both cemeteries. In 1860 and 1863 the cemetery was extended again and in 1869 reached its present form. However, it began to overcrowd and in 1885 all burials financed by the Jewish community (i.e. of the poor) were directed to the Bródno Jewish Cemetery. In 1877 several notable Jewish families of Warsaw financed a new late Neo-Classical building by Adolf Schimmelpfennig housing a synagogue and two burial houses (one for men and one for women). The second floor was reserved for rabbi's flat.

As the cemetery was used by all groups of Warsaw's Jewry, conflicts arose over control of the cemetery and various burial-related issues. In 1913 it was agreed to split it onto four parts: one for Orthodox Jews, one for Reform Jews, one for children, and one for military and state burials. After World War I the cemetery again became overcrowded. Subsequently, a mound or earthwork terrace was erected over the quarter previously reserved for children to allow for more burials. Between 1918 and 1936 fourteen such mounds were created. In the 1930s the entire cemetery was surrounded with a high wall, and in 1939 construction started on a Mausoleum of Jews Fighting for Polish Independence. Works were stopped by the outbreak of World War II and the German occupation of Poland.

During World War II the cemetery was partly demolished. German forces used it for mass executions and the burial of victims of Warsaw Ghetto, the Warsaw Ghetto Uprising, the Warsaw Uprising of 1944, and other mass murders. Those burials included both Jews and non-Jews. Following the Ghetto Uprising, on May 15, 1943 the Germans detonated all buildings in the area of the cemetery, including the synagogue and burial houses. Only a small well survives to this day. Further damage was done to the cemetery during the Warsaw Uprising of 1944, when the front line passed directly through the cemetery. After the war the cemetery was reopened. The Communist authorities of Poland planned a road directly through the middle of the cemetery. The plans were never carried out because of efforts of an American diplomat Alfred Brainard who responded to a call for help from Jewish organizations

In the 1990s the neglected cemetery started to be renovated for the first time since the 1930s, mostly by the re-created Warsaw Jewish Commune and the Nissenbaum Family Foundation, as well as the City of Warsaw municipal government. The cemetery is still open, with 20 to 30 new burials every year.

Notable interments

Solomon Anski, writer (Solomon Zangwill Rappaport), author of "The Dybbuk"
Szymon Askenazy, archaeologist
Meir Balaban
Naftali Zvi Yehuda Berlin, Rosh yeshiva of the Volozhin Yeshiva and author of several major Jewish works
Mathias Bersohn, philanthropist
Adam Czerniakow (1880–1942), head of the Judenrat in the Warsaw Ghetto
Szymon Datner, historian
Jacob Dinezon (1852–1919), writer
Marek Edelman
Maksymilian Fajans, artist, lithographer and photographer
Maurycy Fajans, founder of the first steamboat line on the Vistula
Alexander Flamberg, chess master
Edward Flatau, neurologist
Uri Nissan Gnessin, writer
Samuel Goldflam, neurologist
Ester Rachel Kamińska (1870–1925), the "mother of Yiddish Theater", mother of Ida Kamińska
Michał Klepfisz
Janusz Korczak, famous author and physician
Izaak Kramsztyk, rabbi and lawyer
Aleksander Lesser, painter and art critic
Szlomo Zalman Lipszyc, first Chief Rabbi of Warsaw
Dow Ber Meisels, rabbi of Kraków and Warsaw
Eliyahu Shlomo HaLevi of Lida, Hasidic rabbi
Samuel Orgelbrand, publisher of the Universal Encyclopaedia
Isaac Loeb Peretz (1852–1915) one of the most important Yiddish language writers of the 19th-20th centuries
Samuel Abraham Poznański
Józef Różański, communist activist
Józef Sandel, art historian and critic
Hayyim Selig Slonimski, Hebrew publisher, astronomer, inventor and science author
Chaim Soloveitchik, founder of the Brisk rabbinic dynasty & the "brisker method" of Talmudic study
Yosef Dov Soloveitchik, author of the Beis Halevi and father of Chaim Soloveitchik
Julian Stryjkowski, (born Pesach Stark) 1905–1996, writer, author of "Austeria" "Voices in Darkness"
Hipolit Wawelberg, founder of Warsaw Technical College,
Szymon Winawer,  chess player
Lucjan Wolanowski
Ludwik Zamenhof, doctor and inventor of Esperanto.

See also
 Jewish cemeteries of Warsaw
 Monument to the Memory of Children - Victims of the Holocaust
 History of the Jews in Warsaw

References

External links 
 Okopowa Street Jewish Cemetery at Museum of the History of Polish Jews, Virtual Shtetl
 Website of an ongoing project of writing down all the names from the Okopowa Street Jewish Cemetery
 "Gesia" Jewish Cemetery Foundation - https://web.archive.org/web/20180131184103/http://www.jewishcem.waw.pl/english/start.htm
 http://history1900s.about.com/library/holocaust/aa100499.htm 

Cemeteries in Warsaw
Jewish cemeteries in Poland
Wola
1806 establishments in Poland
Art Nouveau cemeteries
Art Nouveau architecture in Poland
Holocaust locations in Poland
Orthodox Judaism in Poland
Reform Judaism in Poland